Scopula seydeli is a moth of the  family Geometridae. It is found in the Democratic Republic of Congo, Kenya, Malawi and Uganda.

References

Moths described in 1934
Taxa named by Louis Beethoven Prout
seydeli
Moths of Africa